The 2007–08 A1 Grand Prix of Nations, Zhuhai, China was an A1 Grand Prix race held on December 16, 2007, at the Zhuhai International Circuit, China. It was the fourth meeting in the 2007-08 A1 Grand Prix season.

Pre-race 
After suffering injuries in a sportscar racing accident in the United States, Tomáš Enge is back to drive the A1 Team Czech Republic car. Erik Janis who drove since the first round in Zandvoort, this season, will be rookie driver.

Qualifications 
India and Narain Karthikeyan score the team's best-ever grid slot with a 3rd position in the Main Race.

Sprint race 
The start make it through but Australia, South Africa, Lebanon and Brazil and Malaysia are all involved in a multi-car crash in turn 5, lap 1 and the Safety car is out. Brazil and South Africa collide and result the Lebanon is out, Malaysia and South Africa retire in the pit and Brazil loses a lap.
Safety car is in on lap 4 and the order is Germany, Switzerland, Ireland, China, Czech Republic and Great Britain. Switzerland come near Germany ; China is pushing Ireland hard. In lap 8, Neel Jani (Switzerland) sets the fastest lap and in lap 11 Cong Fu Cheng (China) passes Adam Carroll (Ireland) for 3rd. Ireland fights back until crossing the line.
New Zealand and Canada fight for 10th since Safety car is on and in lap 11, the two cars touch. Canada spins down to 15th. The same lap, Portugal crash at the final turn.
Germany wins its first race of the season in front of Switzerland, China, Ireland, Czech Republic, Great Britain, India, France, Netherlands and New Zealand. A1 Team China and Cong Fu Cheng enjoy their success in their home race.

Main race 
Just before the race, it was announced that the second pit stop window will be between laps 25 and 33. The race start at 15:00, local time. At the first turn, Ireland and Brazil collide and are delayed. Germany ran wide and lost a lot of places. Malaysia stranded out of the track after a collision with New Zealand and the Safety car is out in this first lap. Brazil, with smoke coming out of the car, Canada and Australia comes into pits meanwhile Edoardo Piscopo (Italy) his pulled off onto the side of the circuit.
Robert Wickens retire is car in pit because of mechanical failure the lap before the Safety car is in, on lap 5. Several fight in the next laps. New Zealand has passed China and then USA for 6th. The first pit stop window is open on lap 8 and the current standing is Great Britain, Switzerland with the current fastest lap, India, France, South Africa, New Zealand, China and USA.
Narain Karthikeyan(India), Loïc Duval (France) and Oliver Jarvis (Great Britain) comes in pit. Neel Jani (Switzerland) still out for one more lap during the long pit stop of the British driver. The Netherlands damage the suspension and retire on lap 9. After most of the racers have made their first compulsory stop, Switzerland lead the race. Portugal stack up India, France, Great Britain and South Africa until it goes off on lap 14. The next lap, South Africa passes Great Britain for 5th. In lap 16, after Portugal pit, Switzerland lead from India, New Zealand, France, South Africa and Great Britain.
Australia is back on track after losing 3 laps in garage. France receive a drive-through penalty for clipping USA's left-rear airline as it left the pit box. Loïc Duval return on track on 15th. Chris Alajajian (Lebanon) clips a kerb, spin and lost a lot of time in lap 18. Lap 19, Adam Carroll (Ireland) pull into the pits and Satrio Hermanto (Indonesia) retire into the gravel. France is on a charge, is now 10th and take the fastest lap in lap 21.
The second pit stop window is now open on lap 25. Switzerland have a problem with the right rear tyre and bring the car to  the pits but it lost time to take the wheel off. India is now leading. After a slow stop for Great Britain and India, Oliver Jarvis (Great Britain) make the fastest lap on lap 29. China is going to be given a drive-through penalty for speeding in the pits. Now, the standing is India front of New Zealand, South Africa, Germany, Great Britain, Switzerland and France.
Germany and Great Britain are pushing South Africa until the finish line. Cong Fu Cheng (China) is fighting with Jonathan Summerton (USA) since lap 37 and passes in lap 40 when USA has gone wide across the grass. Jonny Reid (New Zealand) is now close from Narain Karthikeyan (India). India wins and score the team's first ever win in A1GP, it is the 14th nation to take a win. The final standing is India, New Zealand, South Africa, Germany, Great Britain with fastest lap, Switzerland, France, Czech Republic, China and USA.

After-race 
After the first win of the A1 Team India in A1 Grand Prix this weekend, on feature race, Dr. Manmohan Singh, the nation's Prime Minister congratulate Narain Karthikeyan and the team. In January 2008, just before the next round, in Taupo, New Zealand, Narain Karthikeyan meets Indian President, Pratibha Patil who congratulate him and the team's achievements in Zuhai.

Notes 
 It was the 26th race weekend (52 starts).
 It was the first venue in Zhuhai International Circuit, the fourth in China (including Shanghai and Beijing venues)
 It was the first race for David Garza Perez and Edoardo Piscopo.
 It was the first race weekend for Gonçalo Araújo, Clemente Faria Jr, Alexandre Imperatori, Niall Quinn, David Garza Perez and Danny Watts.
 Records:
 India won its first race.
 Switzerland scored 6 poles position.
 Lebanon participate on 26 rounds (52 starts) without won points since their first Grand Prix.
 Alex Yoong participate on 25 races (48 starts).
 Neel Jani won 218 points.

References

External links 
 Germany wins the Sprint race
 Sprint race: lap-by-lap
 Sprint Race Results
 First win for A1 Team India
 Feature race: lap-by-lap
 Feature Race Results

A1 Grand Prix Of Nations, Zhuhai, China, 2007-08
A1 Grand Prix